Celeste Rita Raspanti (born 10 September 1928) is an American playwright who has published and produced several full-length and one-act plays.

Raspanti was born in Chicago to an Italian immigrant father and Italian-American mother. She has a special interest in the Holocaust, which she first brought to the stage with I Never Saw Another Butterfly, a play based on the real-life story of Holocaust survivor Raja Englanderova and stories from the Theresienstadt concentration camp.  (A well-known book of drawings and poetry produced by children at Terezin has been published under the same title.)  Subsequent plays on this topic include No Fading Star and The Terezin Promise.  Raspanti has been acclaimed for enriching her stories with firsthand information of the camps from visits, oral histories, and her friendship with survivors - most notably, with Raja Englanderova, the protagonist of I Never Saw Another Butterfly.

Celeste Raspanti first became interested in writing when she won a high school essay contest in 1943.  A former nun and retired college professor, she also publishes articles in academic and professional journals.

Raspanti resides in St. Paul, Minnesota, United States.

See also
 I Never Saw Another Butterfly

External links 

 Where Does a Play Begin? by Celeste R. Raspanti
 Celeste Raspanti plays published by Dramatic Publishing Company

References

1928 births
Living people
Writers from Chicago
American writers of Italian descent
20th-century American dramatists and playwrights
American women dramatists and playwrights
20th-century American women writers
21st-century American women